Charlie is the name given to a Neolithic skeleton of a three-year-old child found near the ancient stone circle of Avebury, Wiltshire, England. Charlie was excavated from Windmill Hill, Avebury in the 1920s and is currently on display at the Alexander Keiller Museum at Avebury.

There is a certain amount of controversy surrounding the display of the skeleton. The Council of British Druid Orders (CoBDO) demanded that the skeleton be reburied where it was found, or as near as is practically possible, claiming that putting a skeleton in a museum as an attraction is disrespectful. The archaeological community fear that reburying Charlie will lead to a dangerous precedent being set. Historians have also argued that Charlie's skeleton should be kept in a museum so it is available for research. English Heritage and The National Trust held a public consultation on the future of Charlie; in April 2010 the decision was made to keep the skeleton on public view.

External links

BBC News report 
thisisbristol.co.uk Local News report

Neolithic England
Human remains (archaeological)
Stone Age sites in England
Archaeological sites in Wiltshire
Prehistoric burials in England